Brunker is a surname. Notable people with the surname include:

Adrian Brunker (born 1970), Australian rugby league player
Amanda Brunker (born 1974), Irish writer and journalist
James Brunker (1832–1910), Australian politician
James Robert Brunker (1806–1869), British Army general
Joel Brunker (born 1986), Australian boxer
Hazel Brunker (born 1932), Welsh chess master
Michael Brunker, American journalist
Richard Brunker, English politician